Daatu (meaning: cross) is a novel by Kannada writer S L Bhyrappa for which he was awarded the Sahitya Akademi Award for the year 1975. The Book  has story which goes through the complex caste system that is deep rooted into Indian society demonstrated through the characters. This book has been translated to 14 major Indian Languages. The novel name indicated the crossing over the boundaries of castes and colors.

The novel was translated into Gujarati by Jaya Mehta, published in 1992.

References

20th-century Indian novels
Kannada novels
1973 Indian novels
Sahitya Akademi Award-winning works
Novels by S. L. Bhyrappa